Conor Phelan (born 1983) is an Irish hurler who played as a left wing-forward for the Kilkenny senior team.

Phelan joined the team during the 2003 championship and made several appearances as a substitute until illness forced him to retire after just two seasons. During that time he won one All-Ireland winners' medal.

At club level Phelan plays with the Clara club.

In January 2021, he joined Kilkenny's senior hurling management team for the 2021 season.

Career statistics

Honours

Waterford Institute of Technology
Fitzgibbon Cup: 2003, 2004

Clara
Kilkenny Senior Hurling Championship: 2013
Kilkenny Intermediate Hurling Championship: 2007

Kilkenny
All-Ireland Senior Hurling Championship: 2003
Leinster Senior Hurling Championship: 2003, 2005
National Hurling League: 2003, 2005
All-Ireland Intermediate Hurling Championship: 2008
Leinster Intermediate Hurling Championship: 2008
All-Ireland Under-21 Hurling Championship: 2003, 2004
Leinster Under-21 Hurling Championship: 2003, 2004
Leinster Minor Hurling Championship: 2001

References

1983 births
Living people
Clara hurlers
Kilkenny inter-county hurlers
All-Ireland Senior Hurling Championship winners
Hurling selectors